The Battle of Kassa was fought on October 18, 1685, in the city of Kassa in the Kingdom of Hungary (now Košice in Slovakia), between the armies of the Ottoman Empire and of the Holy Roman Empire. 

The Austrian Commander, Field Marshal Aeneas de Caprara, defeated the Ottoman Army near the city and with this victory regained Habsburg control of which had been lost in 1682 to the Kuruc leader Imre Thököly. Košice at the time was defended by a modern pentagonal fortress (citadel)  built by the Habsburgs south of the city in the 1670s.

References 

Battles of the Great Turkish War
Battles involving the Ottoman Empire
Battles involving the Holy Roman Empire
Conflicts in 1685
1685 in Europe
B